Benjamin Franklin Haynes (1851–1923), usually known as B. F. Haynes, was a Methodist and later Nazarene minister and theologian from Tennessee. He was associated with the Holiness movement.

He was founding editor of the Tennessee Methodist. Later he was the founding editor of Herald of Holiness, the flagship journal  of the Church of the Nazarene, now known as Holiness Today.  He was also president of Martin Methodist College in Pulaski, Tennessee from 1902 to 1905 and Asbury College in Wilmore, Kentucky from 1905 to 1908.

He wrote a book, Tempest-Tossed on Methodist Seas, about his decision to leave the Methodist Episcopal Church, South because of bitter divisions within the church over the holiness movement.

References

 Farish, Hunter D., The Circuit Rider Dismounts: A Social History of Southern Methodism, 1865-1900 1938
 Smith, John Abernathy, Cross and Flame: Two Centuries of United Methodism in Middle Tennessee 1984
 Isaac, Paul E., Prohibition and Politics: Turbulent Decades in Tennessee (1885-1920) 1965
 Coker, Joe L., Liquor in the Land of the Lost Cause: Southern White Evangelicals and the Prohibition Movement University Press of Kentucky
 Cunningham, Floyd, ed., Our Watchword and Song: The Centennial History of the Church of the Nazarene 2009

External links
 

Methodist ministers
Nazarene theologians
Presidents of Asbury University
1851 births
1923 deaths
Editors of Christian publications
American religious writers
American male journalists
American Methodist clergy
Methodist writers
19th-century Methodists
American temperance activists
People from Franklin, Tennessee
People from Nashville, Tennessee
Southern Methodists